Hylobius is a genus of true weevils (family Curculionidae). Several Hylobius species are major pests of coniferous trees.

Species
Species include:

Hylobius abietis Linnaeus, 1758 — pine weevil
Hylobius albosparsus Boheman - big larch weevil
Hylobius aliradicis Warner, 1966 — southern pine root weevil
Hylobius alpheus Reiche, 1857
Hylobius congener Dalla Torre et al., 1943 — seedling debarking weevil
Hylobius excavatus Laicharting, 1781
Hylobius graecus Pic, 1902
Hylobius huguenini Reitter, 1891
Hylobius pales Herbst, 1797 - pales weevil
Hylobius piceus (DeGeer)
Hylobius pinastri Gyllenhaal, 1813 — pine weevil
Hylobius pinicola Couper, 1864 — Couper collar weevil
Hylobius radicis Buchanan, 1935 — pine root collar weevil
Hylobius rhizophagus Benjamin & Walker, 1963 — root tip weevil, Millers
Hylobius transversovittatus Goeze, 1777 — Goeze root-boring weevil
Hylobius warreni Wood, 1957 — Warren's collar weevil

See also 
 Forest pathology

References 
 Fauna Europaea
 Nomina Insect Nearctica

External links 

Molytinae
Curculionidae genera